The Nazca Province is one of five provinces of the Ica Region of Peru. The capital of the province is the city of Nazca.

Political division 
The Nasca Province is divided into five districts, each of which is headed by a mayor (alcalde):

Districts 
 Changuillo
 El Ingenio
 Marcona
 Nazca
 Vista Alegre

Culture
The Nazca Province is the birthplace of the Nazca culture. The Province is also famous with the so-called Nazca lines, located in the Nazca Desert in southern Peru.

See also 
Administrative divisions of Peru

References

Provinces of the Ica Region